The Barefoot Emperor is a 2019 Belgian comedy film directed by Jessica Woodworth and Peter Brosens. It was screened in the Contemporary World Cinema section at the 2019 Toronto International Film Festival. It is a sequel to King of the Belgians, a 2016  mockumentary by the same directors. Events from the first movie are briefly recapped at the beginning of the film.

At the 11th Magritte Awards, The Barefoot Emperor received a nomination in the category of Best Flemish Film.

Cast

 Peter Van den Begin as King Nicolas
 Lucie Debay as Louise Vancraeyenest
 Udo Kier as Dr. Otto Kroll
 Geraldine Chaplin as Lady Liz / Dr. Ilse von Stroheim / Mama Wakolux
 Bruno Georis as Ludovic Moreau
 Titus De Voogdt as Carlos De Vos

References

External links
 
 

2019 films
2019 comedy films
Belgian comedy films
2010s Dutch-language films